"Canton" is an instrumental song by English new wave band Japan. It was originally released on the album Tin Drum in 1981, and was then released as the only single from the live album Oil on Canvas in May 1983. It peaked at number 42 on the UK Singles Chart.

Original recording 
"Canton" was the first song recorded for Japan's album Tin Drum, along with "Talking Drum" and David Sylvian said the two songs "worked so well we’d arrange the rest of the album around the same ideas. Difficulty with recording arose when Mick Karn had to rub the aluminium neck of his Travis Bean bass guitar quite frantically and the heat generated "was enough to bend the metal out of pitch". Because of this, the guitar had to be cooled down mid-recording and to get around this problem, Karn switched to a local bass manufacture Wal, "which worked perfectly on the first take". The band also found under some tarpaulin an instrument made of bamboo that was several feet in height and width and sound was "produced by rattling peas within the bamboo" and these "duplicate the piece’s main melody".

Reception 
Reviewing the single for Record Mirror, Simon Hills wrote "Sounds like the theme music to The Secret Lovers of Chairman Mao", with "more oriental, and totally glib, 'art' on the flip side with 'Visions Of China' in which the group imagine all the royalties they could get by selling a record to the country with the biggest population".

Track listings 
7"

 "Canton" – 4:05
 "Visions of China" – 3:45

12"
 "Canton" – 5:36
 "Visions of China" – 3:45

Personnel 
 David Sylvian – keyboards, cover design
 Mick Karn – fretless bass, dida
 Richard Barbieri – keyboards
 Steve Jansen – drums, percussion
 Masami Tsuchiya – keyboards
 Yuka Fujii – photography
 John Punter – engineer, producer
 Nigel Walker – engineer

Charts

References 

1981 songs
1983 songs
1983 singles
Songs written by David Sylvian
Japan (band) songs
Virgin Records singles